Zagłębie Lubin II is a Polish football team, which serves as the reserve side of Zagłębie Lubin. They compete in the II liga, the third division of Polish football. The club participated in the Polish Cup in the 2007–08, 2014–15, 2017–18 and 2019–20 seasons.

References

External links
 Zagłębie Lubin II at 90minut.pl 

 
Reserve team football in Poland